Caversham Wildlife Park is a wildlife park currently located in Whiteman Park in Western Australia. It is home to several Australian animals including kangaroos, koalas, possums, wallabies, wombats and Tasmanian devils.   

It was originally located in the locality of Caversham. The Park was bought by a couple, David and Pat, in 1988 and covered 5 acres of land. It was later doubled in size when the couple bought the adjoining property and increased the number of animals.

It shifted into Whiteman Park in 2003.

Animals and exhibits

Marsupials
Red kangaroo (in both their normal and albino morphs)
Western grey kangaroo                   
Swamp wallaby
Yellow-footed rock-wallaby
Red-necked wallaby
Agile wallaby
Tammar wallaby 
Quokka
Common wallaroo
Sugar glider
Squirrel glider
Greater glider 
Brush-tailed possum
Rufous bettong
Brush-tailed bettong
Long-nosed potoroo
Koala
Southern hairy-nosed wombat
Common wombat
Tiger quoll
Tasmanian devil

Other Mammals
Dingo
Red fox
Spectacled flying fox
Grey-headed flying fox
Short-beaked echidna
Water buffalo
Various farm animals such as horses, llamas, sheepdogs

Birds
Southern cassowary
Emu
Ostrich
Laughing kookaburra
Blue-winged kookaburra
Wedge-tailed eagle
Black-breasted buzzard
Bush thick-knee
Australian bustard
Black swan
Tawny frogmouth
Powerful owl
Morepork
Lesser sooty owl
Common barn owl
Australian wood duck
Pacific black duck
Australian shelduck
Magpie goose
Little penguin
Silver gull
Australian pelican
Rainbow lorikeet
Galah
Gang-gang cockatoo
Eclectus parrot
Red-tailed black cockatoo
Sulphur-crested cockatoos and many other brightly-coloured species of birds

Reptiles and amphibians

Snakes
Woma python
Black-headed python
Olive python
Water python
Carpet python
Amethystine python
Dugite
Coastal taipan
Common death adder
Brown tree snake
Tiger snake
King brown snake

Lizards
Northern blue-tongued skink
Shingleback lizard
Central bearded dragon
Frilled dragon
Perentie
Lace monitor
Merten's water monitor
Emerald tree monitor
Crocodile monitor
Spiny-tailed gecko
Crested bicycle dragon
Lozenge-marked dragon
Cunningham's spiny-tailed skink
Fraser's delma
Marble-faced delma

Crocodiles and turtles
Freshwater crocodile
Pig-nosed turtle
New Guinea snake-necked turtle
Northern red-faced turtle
Mary River turtle
New Guinea snapping turtle

Amphibians
Green tree frog
White-lipped tree frog
Motorbike frog
Barred frog
Green-thighed frog
Magnificent tree frog

Notes

External links
  Caversham Wildlife Park website

Whiteman Park
Wildlife parks in Australia
Zoos in Western Australia
Tourist attractions in Perth, Western Australia